Transport in India consists of transport by land, water and air. Road transport is the primary mode of transport for most Indian citizens, and India's road transport systems are among the most heavily used in the world.

India's road network is the second-largest, after the United States, and one of the busiest in the world, transporting 8.225 billion passengers and over 980 million tonnes of cargo annually, as of 2015. India's rail network is the fourth largest and second busiest in the world, transporting 8.09 billion passengers and 1.20 billion tonnes of freight annually,  Aviation in India is broadly divided into military and civil aviation which is the fastest-growing aviation market in the world (IATA data). India's waterways network, in the form of rivers, canals, backwaters and creeks, is the ninth largest waterway network in the world. Freight transport by waterways is highly under utilised in India with the total cargo moved (in tonne kilometres) by inland waterways being 0.1 percent of the total inland traffic in India. In total, about 21 percent of households have two wheelers whereas 4.70 percent of households in India have cars or vans as per the 2011 census of India. The automobile industry in India is currently rapidly growing with an annual production of over 4.6 million vehicles, with an annual growth rate of 10.5% and vehicle volume is expected to rise greatly in the future.

Traditional means of transport

Walking 
Walking has constituted a major form of transport in ancient times. People used to cover long distances on foot or bullock carts. For instance, Adi Sankaracharya travelled all over India from Kalady near Kochi. Walking still constitutes an important mode of transport in rural areas. In the city of Mumbai, to further improve the transit conditions for pedestrians, the Mumbai Metropolitan Region Development Authority, has commenced the construction of more than 50 skywalks, as part of the Mumbai Skywalk project, which is very helpful as walk enthusiasts take part in reducing traffic. The Dakshineswar skywalk has also come up in West Bengal.

Palanquins 

Palanquins, also known as palkis, were one of the luxurious methods used by the rich and noblemen for travelling and also to carry a deity (idol) of a god. Many temples have sculptures of a god being carried in palkis. Modern use of the palanquin is limited to Indian weddings, pilgrimage and carrying idols of gods.

Bullock carts/horse carriages 

Bullock carts have been traditionally used for transport, especially in rural India. The arrival of the British saw drastic improvements in the horse carriages which were used for transport since early days. Today, they are used in smaller towns and are referred as tanga or buggies. Victorias of Mumbai, which were used for tourist purposes, are now banned and plans are afloat to replace it with Victoria-styled electric carriages. Horse carriages are now rarely found in the cities of India baring tourist areas and hill stations. In recent years cities have banned the movement of slow moving vehicles on the main roads.

Bicycles 

Bicycles or cycles, have ownership rates ranging from around 30% to 75% at the state level. Along with walking, cycling accounts for 50% to 80% of the commuter trips for those in the informal sector in urban areas. However, recent developments suggest that bicycle riding is quickly becoming popular in the metropolitan cities of India. In recent years, government development authorities all over India encourages the setup and use of separate bicycle lanes alongside the roads to combat pollution and ease traffic congestion.

Human-pulled rickshaws 

Human-pulled rickshaws are nowadays rarely available in various cities and villages in the country. Many local governments have proposed a ban on these rickshaws describing them as "inhuman". The Government of West Bengal proposed a ban on these rickshaws in 2005. Though a bill aiming to address this issue, termed as Calcutta Hackney Carriage Bill, was passed by the West Bengal Assembly in 2006, it has not yet been implemented. The Government of West Bengal is working on an amendment to this bill to avoid the loopholes that were exposed when the Hand-pulled Rickshaw Owners' Association filed a petition against the bill.

Cycle rickshaw 
Cycle rickshaws were introduced in India in the 1940s. They are bigger than a tricycle where two people sit on an elevated seat at the back and a person pedals from the front. In the late 2000s, they were banned in several cities for causing traffic congestion. The Delhi Police recently submitted an affidavit against plying of cycle rickshaws to ease traffic congestion in the city but it was dismissed by the Delhi High Court. In addition, environmentalists have supported the retention of cycle rickshaws as a non-polluting mode of transport.

Road 

 
 

At 0.66 km of highway per square kilometre of land the density of India's highway network is higher than that of the United States (0.65) and far higher than that of China's (0.16) or Brazil's (0.20).

India has a network of National Highways connecting all the major cities and state capitals, forming the economic backbone of the country. Although India has large network of four or more lane highways of international quality standards, but without access control (entry/exit control), they are not called as expressways but simply highways.

As per the National Highways Authority of India, about 66% of freight and 82% passenger traffic is carried by the roads. The National Highways carry about 40% of total road traffic, though only about 2% of the road network is covered by these roads. Average growth of the number of vehicles has been around 10.16% per annum over recent years.

India also has many bridges and flyovers in major cities to reduce traffic congestion. Some notable projects include Bandra - Worli Sea link in Mumbai and Kathipara Cloverleaf Interchange in Chennai.

Under National Highways Development Project (NHDP), work is under progress to equip national highways with at least four lanes; also there is a plan to convert some stretches of these roads to six lanes. In recent years construction has commenced on a nationwide system of multi-lane highways, including the Golden Quadrilateral connecting four important metropolitan cities of India (Delhi-Kolkata-Chennai-Mumbai) and North-South and East-West Corridors which link the largest cities in India.

In 2000, around 40% of villages in India lacked access to all-weather roads and remained isolated during the monsoon season. To improve rural connectivity, Pradhan Mantri Gram Sadak Yojana (Prime Minister's Rural Road Program), a project funded by the Central Government with the help of the World Bank, was launched in 2000 to build all-weather roads to connect all habitations with a population of 500 or above (250 or above for hilly areas).

Bus 

Buses are an important means of public transport in India. Due to this social significance, urban bus transport is often owned and operated by public agencies, and most state governments operate bus services through a state road transport corporation. These corporations have proven extremely useful in connecting villages and towns across the country. Alongside the public companies there are many private bus fleets: As of 2012, there were 131,800 publicly owned buses in India, but 1,544,700 buses owned by private companies.

However, the share of buses is negligible in most Indian cities as compared to personalised vehicles, and two-wheelers and cars account for more than 80 percent of the vehicle population in most large cities.

Bus rapid transit systems 

Bus rapid transit systems (BRTS), exist in several cities. Buses take up over 90% of public transport in Indian cities, and serve as an important mode of transport. Services are mostly run by state government owned transport corporations. In 1990s, all government state transport corporations have introduced various facilities like low-floor buses for the disabled and air-conditioned buses to attract private car owners to help decongest roads.

In 2010, the Ahmedabad Bus Rapid Transit System won the prestigious Sustainable Transport Award from the Transportation Research Board in Washington. Rainbow BRTS in Pune is the first BRTS system in the country. Mumbai introduced air conditioned buses in 1998. Bangalore was the first city in India to introduce Volvo B7RLE intra-city buses in India in January 2005. Bangalore is the first Indian city to have an air-conditioned bus stop, located near Cubbon Park. It was built by Airtel. The city of Chennai houses one of Asia's largest bus terminus, the Chennai Mofussil Bus Terminus.

Motor vehicles

Two-wheelers 
Motorised two-wheeler vehicles like scooters, motorcycles and mopeds are very popular due to their fuel efficiency and ease of use in congested roads or streets. The number of two-wheelers sold is several times to that of cars. There were 47.5 million powered two-wheelers in India in 2003 compared with just 8.6 million cars.

Manufacture of motorcycles in India started when Royal Enfield began assembly in its plant in Chennai in 1948. Royal Enfield, an iconic brand name in the country, manufactures different variants of the British Bullet motorcycle which is a classic motorcycle that is still in production. Hero MotoCorp (formerly Hero Honda), Honda, Bajaj Auto, Yamaha, TVS Motors and Mahindra 2 Wheelers are the largest two-wheeler companies in terms of market-share.

Manufacture of scooters in India started when Automobile Products of India (API) set up at Mumbai and incorporated in 1949. They began assembling Innocenti-built Lambretta scooters in India. They eventually acquired a licence for the Li150 series model, of which they began full-fledged production from the early 1960s onwards. In 1972, Scooters India Limited (SIL), a state-run enterprise based in Lucknow, Uttar Pradesh, bought the entire manufacturing rights of the last Innocenti Lambretta model. API has infrastructural facilities at Mumbai, Aurangabad, and Chennai, but has been non-operational since 2002.  SIL stopped producing scooters in 1998.

Motorcycles and scooters can be rented in many cities, Wicked Ride, Metro Bikes and many other companies are working with state governments to solve last-mile connectivity problems with mass-transit solutions. Wearing protective headgear is mandatory for both the rider and the pillion-rider in most cities.

Automobiles 
Private automobiles account for 30% of the total transport demand in urban areas of India. An average of 963 new private vehicles are registered every day in Delhi alone. The number of automobiles produced in India rose from 6.3 million in 2002–2003 to 11 million (11.2 million) in 2008–2009. There is substantial variation among cities and states in terms of dependence on private cars: Bangalore, Chennai, Delhi and Kolkata have 185, 127, 157 and 140 cars per 1,000 people respectively, which is much lower compared to developed countries. This reflects different levels of urban density and varied qualities of public transport infrastructure. Nationwide, India still has a very low rate of car ownership. When comparing car ownership between BRICS developing countries, it is on a par with China, and exceeded by Brazil and Russia.

Compact cars, especially hatchbacks predominate due to affordability, fuel efficiency, congestion, and lack of parking space in most cities. Chennai is known as the "Detroit of India" for its automobile industry.

Maruti, Hyundai and Tata Motors are the most popular brands in the order of their market share. The Ambassador once had a monopoly, but is now an icon of pre-liberalisation India, and is still used by taxi companies. The Maruti 800 launched in 1984, created the first revolution in the Indian auto sector because of its low price and high quality. It had the highest market share until 2004, when it was overtaken by other low-cost models from Maruti such as the Alto and the Wagon R, the Indica from Tata Motors and the Santro from Hyundai. Over the 20 years since its introduction, about 2.4 million Maruti 800s have been sold. However, with the launch of the Tata Nano, the least expensive production car in the world, the Maruti 800 lost its popularity. India is also known for a variety of indigenous vehicles made in villages out of simple motors and vehicle spare parts. A few of these innovations are the Jugaad, Maruta, Chhakda, Peter Rehra and the Fame.

In the city of Bangalore, Radio One and the Bangalore Traffic Police, launched a carpooling drive which has involved celebrities such as Robin Uthappa, and Rahul Dravid encouraging the public to carpool. The initiative got a good response, and by the end of May 2009, 10,000 people are said to have carpooled in the city. There have been efforts to improve the energy efficiency of transport systems in Indian cities, including by introducing performance standards for private automobiles or by banning particularly polluting older cars. The city of Kolkata, for example, passed a law in 2009/10 phasing out vehicles over 15 years old with the purpose of reducing air pollution. However, the effects were mixed. On the one hand, poorer urban residents are more likely to see public health improvements from better air quality, since they are more likely to live in polluted areas and work outdoors than richer urban residents. On the other hand, drivers of such vehicles suffered from losing their livelihoods as a result of this environmental regulation.

Utility vehicles 
The first utility vehicle in India was manufactured by Mahindra. It was a copy of the original Jeep and was manufactured under licence. The vehicle was an instant hit and made Mahindra one of the top companies in India. The Indian Army and police extensively use Mahindra vehicles along with Maruti Gypsys for transporting personnel and equipment. Tata Motors, the automobile manufacturing arm of the Tata Group, launched its first utility vehicle, the Tata Sumo, in 1994. The Sumo, owing to its then-modern design, captured a 31% share of the market within two years. The Tempo Trax from Force Motors until recently was ruling the rural areas. Sports utility vehicles now form a sizeable part of the passenger vehicle market. Models from Tata, Honda, Hyundai, Ford and other brands are available.

Taxis 

Most of the taxicabs in Mumbai and Kolkata are either Premier Padmini or Hindustan Ambassador cars. in rest of cities all modern cars are available. However, foreign developed app based taxi services like Uber as well as an Indian developed app based taxi services like Ola coming to the fore, taxicabs now include Sedans, SUVs  and even motorcycle taxis. Depending on the city/state, taxis can either be hailed or hired from taxi-stands. In cities such as Bengaluru, Chennai, Hyderabad and Ahmedabad, taxis need to be hired over phone, whereas in cities like Kolkata and Mumbai, taxis can also be hailed on the street. According to Government of India regulations, all taxis are required to have a fare-meter installed. There are additional surcharges for luggage, late-night rides and toll taxes are to be paid by the passenger. Since year 2006, radio taxis have become increasingly popular with the public due to reasons of safety and convenience.

In cities and localities, where taxis are expensive or do not charge as per the government or municipal regulated fares, people use share taxis. These are normal taxis which carry one or more passengers travelling to destinations either on one route to the final destination, or near the final destination.  The passengers are charged according to the number of people with different destinations.  The city of Mumbai will soon be the first city in India, to have an "in-taxi" magazine, titled MumBaee, which will be issued to taxis, which are part of the Mumbai Taximen's Union. The magazine debuted on 13 July 2009. In Kolkata, there are many no refusal taxi available with white and blue in colour.

Auto 

An auto is a three-wheeler vehicle for hire that does not have doors and is generally characterised by a small cabin for the driver in the front and a seat for passengers in the rear. Generally it is painted in yellow, green or black and has a black, yellow or green canopy on the top, but designs vary considerably from place to place. The colour of the auto rickshaw is also determined by the fuel that it is powered by, for example Agartala, Ahmedabad, Mumbai, Pune and Delhi have green or black autos indicating the use of compressed natural gas (CNG), whereas the autos of Kolkata, Bengaluru, Hyderabad have green autos indicating the use of LPG.

In Mumbai and other metropolitan cities, 'autos' or 'rickshaws', as they are popularly known, have regulated metered fares. A recent law prohibits auto rickshaw drivers from charging more than the specified fare, or charging night-fare before midnight, and also prohibits the driver from refusing to go to a particular location. Mumbai and Kolkata are also the only two cities, which prohibit auto rickshaws from entering a certain part of the city, in these cases being South Mumbai and certain parts of Downtown Kolkata. However, in cities like Chennai, it is common to see autorickshaw drivers demand more than the specified fare and refuse to use fare meter.

Airports and railway stations at many cities such as Howrah, Chennai and Bengaluru provide a facility of prepaid auto booths, which requires a fixed payment, with a base fare of Rs. 30 and a rate of Rs.14.20 per kilometre after 1.5 kilometres of travel, set by the authorities as of May, 2022. On this basis, the fare is calculated and is to be paid by the passenger.

Electric rickshaw is new popular means of transport, rapidly growing in number in India, due to low running and initial cost, other economic and environmental benefits, these vehicles are becoming popular in India.  E-Rickshaws are made in fiberglass or metal body, powered by a BLDC Electric Motor with max power 2000W and speed 25 km/h.

Rail 

Country-wide rail services in India are provided by the state-run Indian Railways (IR) under the supervision of the Ministry of Railways. IR is divided into eighteen zones including the Kolkata Metro Railway. The IR are further sub-divided into sixty seven divisions, each having a divisional headquarters.

About  or 71% of the route-kilometre was electrified as in March 2019. IR provides an important mode of transport in India, transporting 23.1 million passengers and 3.3 million tons of freight daily as of March 2019. IR is the world's eighth-largest employer, it had 1.227 million employees as of March 2019. As to rolling stock, IR owns over 289,185 (freight) wagons, 74,003 coaches and 12,147 locomotives as of March 2019. It also owns locomotive and coach production facilities. It operates both long distance and suburban rail systems.

The IR runs a number of special types of services which are given higher priority. The Rajdhani trains introduced in 1969 provides connectivity between the national capital, Delhi and capitals of the states. On the other hand, Shatabdi Express provides connectivity between centres of tourism, pilgrimage or business. The Shatabdi Express trains run over short to medium distances and do not have sleepers while the Rajdhani Expresses run over longer distances and have only sleeping accommodation. Both series of trains have a maximum permissible speed of  but average speed of less than 100 km/h..
Besides, the IR also operates a number of luxury trains which cater to various tourist circuits. For instance, the Palace on Wheels serves the Rajasthan circuit and The Golden Chariot serves the Karnataka and Goa circuits. There are two UNESCO World Heritage Sites on IR, the Chhatrapati Shivaji Maharaj Terminus and the Mountain railways of India. The latter consists of three separate railway lines located in different parts of India, the Darjeeling Himalayan Railway, a  narrow gauge railway in Lesser Himalayas in West Bengal, the Nilgiri Mountain Railway, a  rack railway in the Nilgiri Hills in Tamil Nadu and the Kalka-Shimla Railway, a  narrow gauge railway in the Siwalik Hills in Himachal Pradesh.

In the freight segment, IR ferries various commodities and fuels in industrial, consumer, and agricultural segments across the length and breadth of India. IR has historically subsidised the passenger segment with income from the freight business. As a result, freight services are unable to compete with other modes of transport on both cost and speed of delivery, leading to continuous erosion of market share. To counter this downward trend, IR has started new initiatives in freight segments including upgrading of existing goods sheds, attracting private capital to build multi-commodity multi-modal logistics terminals, changing container sizes, operating time-tabled freight trains, and tweaking with the freight pricing/product mix.

In 1999, the Konkan Railway Corporation introduced the Roll on Roll off (RORO) service, a unique road-rail synergy system, on the section between Kolad in Maharashtra and Verna in Goa, which was extended up to Surathkal in Karnataka in 2004. The RORO service, the first of its kind in India, allowed trucks to be transported on flatbed trailers. It was highly popular, carrying about  trucks and bringing in about  740 million worth of earnings to the corporation until 2007.

Perhaps the game-changer for IR in the freight segment are the new dedicated freight corridors that are expected to be completed by 2020. Also, they will free-up capacity on dense passenger routes and will allow IR to run more trains at higher speeds. Additional corridors are being planned to augment the freight infrastructure in the country.

Commuter rail transport
In many Indian metropolitan regions, rail is the more efficient and affordable mode of public transport for daily commute. Examples of types of services include long-established local or suburban rail services in cities such as Mumbai, Kolkata and Chennai, the century-old tram service in Kolkata, the more recent metro service in Kolkata, Delhi and Chennai and Monorail feeder service in Mumbai.

Suburban rail 

The Mumbai Suburban Railway is the first rail system in India, which began services in Mumbai in 1853, transports 6.3 million passengers daily and has the highest passenger density in the world. The Kolkata Suburban Railway was established in 1854, and the Chennai Suburban Railway in 1931. The operational suburban rail systems in India are in Mumbai Suburban Railway, Kolkata Suburban Railway, Chennai Suburban Railway, Lucknow-Kanpur Suburban Railway, Delhi Suburban Railway, Pune Suburban Railway, Hyderabad Multi-Modal Transport System, Barabanki-Lucknow Suburban Railway and Karwar railway division. Other planned systems are Bengaluru Commuter Rail, Ahmedabad Suburban Railway and Coimbatore Suburban Railway.

Mass rapid transit system 
The Chennai MRTS, which began services in 1995, remains the country's first and only mass rapid transit rail. Although distinct from the Chennai Suburban Railway, the MRTS remains integrated in a wider urban rail network.

Metro 

The first modern rapid transit in India is the Kolkata Metro which started its operations in 1984 as the 17th Zone of the Indian Railways. The Delhi Metro in New Delhi is India's second conventional metro and began operations in 2002. The Namma Metro in Bengaluru is India's third operational rapid transit and began operations in 2011. 

The operational systems are Kolkata Metro, Delhi Metro, Namma Metro, Rapid Metro, Mumbai Metro, Jaipur Metro, Chennai Metro, Kochi Metro, Lucknow Metro, Nagpur Metro, Noida Metro, Hyderabad Metro, Kanpur Metro, Ahmedabad Metro, Pune Metro 

The under implementation systems are Ghaziabad Metro, Navi Mumbai Metro, Metro-Link Express for Gandhinagar and Ahmedabad, Varanasi Metro, Bareilly Metro, Vijayawada Metro, Patna Metro, Meerut Metro, Guwahati Metro, Chandigarh Metro, Bhopal Metro, Kozhikode Light Metro, Indore Metro, Thiruvananthapuram Light Metro, Agra Metro, Coimbatore Metro, Visakhapatnam Metro, Surat Metro, Jammu Metro, Srinagar Metro, Greater Gwalior Metro, Jabalpur Metro and Greater Nashik Metro.  Currently, rapid transit is under construction or in planning in several major cities of India and will be opened shortly.

Monorail 

Monorail is generally considered as feeder system for the metro trains in India. In 2004, monorail was first proposed for Kolkata. But, later the idea was put on hold due to lack of funds and infeasibility. The Mumbai Monorail, which started in 2014, is the first operational monorail network in India (excluding the Skybus Metro) since the Patiala State Monorail Trainways closed in 1927.

Other planned systems are Chennai Monorail, Kolkata Monorail, Allahabad Monorail, Bengaluru Monorail, Delhi Monorail, Indore Monorail, Kanpur Monorail, Navi Mumbai Monorail, Patna Monorail, Pune Monorail, Ahmedabad Monorail, Aizawl Monorail, Bhubaneswar Monorail, Jodhpur Monorail, Kota Monorail, Nagpur Monorail and Nashik Monorail.

Tram 

In addition to trains, trams were introduced in many cities in late 19th century, though almost all of these were phased out. The trams in Kolkata is currently the only tram system in the country.

International links 
Rail links between India and neighbouring countries are not well-developed.Bangladesh is connected by a biweekly train, the Maitree Express that runs from Kolkata to Dhaka and a weekly train, the Bandhan Express that runs from Kolkata to Khulna. Two rail links to Nepal exist—passenger services between Jaynagar and Bijalpura, and freight services between Raxaul and Birganj.

No rail link exists with Myanmar but a railway line is to be built through from Jiribam (in Manipur) to Tamu through Imphal and Moreh. The construction of this missing link, as per the feasibility study conducted by the Ministry of External Affairs through RITES Ltd, is estimated to cost . An 18 km railway link with Bhutan is being constructed from Hashimara in West Bengal to Toribari in Bhutan. No rail link exists with either China or Sri Lanka.

High-speed rail 

Prior to the 2014 general election, the major national party (Indian National Congress and Bharatiya Janata Party) pledged to introduce high-speed rail. The BJP pledged to connect all of India's million-plus cities by high-speed rail, later BJP, which won the election, promised to build the Diamond Quadrilateral project, which would connect the cities of Chennai, Delhi, Kolkata, and Mumbai via high-speed rail. This project was approved as a priority for the new government in the incoming prime minister's speech. Construction of one kilometer of high speed railway track will cost  – , which is 10–14 times higher than the construction of standard railway.
Indian government approved the choice of Japan to build India's first high-speed railway. Under the proposal, construction is expected to begin in 2017 and be completed in 2023. India will use the wheel-based 300 km/hr HSR technology, instead of new maglev 600 km/hr technology of the Japan used in Chūō Shinkansen. India is expected to have its HSR line operational from 2025 onwards, once the safety checks are completed.

Light rail 

Like monorail, light rail is also considered as a feeder system for the metro systems. The planned systems are Kolkata Light Rail Transit and Delhi Light Rail Transit.

Airways 

Directorate General of Civil Aviation is the national regulatory body for the aviation industry. It is controlled by the Ministry of Civil Aviation. The ministry also controls aviation related autonomous organisations like the Airports Authority of India (AAI), Bureau of Civil Aviation Security (BCAS), Indira Gandhi Rashtriya Uran Akademi and Public Sector Undertakings including Pawan Hans Helicopters Limited and Hindustan Aeronautics Limited.

Air India is India's national flag carrier after merging with Indian (airline) in 2011 and plays a major role in connecting India with the rest of the world. IndiGo, Air India, Spicejet, Vistara, Jet Airways and Go First are the major carriers in order of their market share. These airlines connect more than 80 cities across India and also operate overseas routes after the liberalisation of Indian aviation. Several other foreign airlines connect Indian cities with other major cities across the globe. However, a large section of country's air transport potential remains untapped, even though the Mumbai-Delhi air corridor was ranked the world's tenth busiest route by Amadeus in 2012.

Airports 

While there are 346 civilian airfields in India – 253 with paved runways and 93 with unpaved runways, only 132 were classified as "airports" as of November 2014. Of these, Indira Gandhi International Airport in Delhi is the busiest in the country. The operations of the major airports in India have been privatised over the past five years and this has resulted in better equipped and cleaner airports. The terminals have either been refurbished or expanded.

India also has 33 "ghost airports," which were built in an effort to make air travel more accessible for those in remote regions but are now non-operational due to a lack of demand. The Jaisalmer Airport in Rajasthan, for example, was completed in 2013 and was expected to host 300,000 passengers a year but has yet to see any commercial flights take off. Despite the number of non-operational airports, India is currently planning on constructing another 200 "low-cost" airports over the next 20 years.

Heliports 

As of 2021, there are 45 heliports in India. Pawan Hans Helicopters Limited is a public sector company that provides helicopter services to ONGC to its off-shore locations, and also to various State Governments in India, particularly in North-east India.

Water 

India also has an extensive network of inland waterways.

Ports and shipping 

In India, about 96% of the foreign trade by quantity and 70% by value takes place through the ports. Mumbai Port & JNPT(Navi Mumbai) handles 70% of maritime trade in India. There are twelve major ports: Navi Mumbai, Mumbai, Chennai, Ennore, Thoothukudi, Kochi, Kolkata (including Haldia), Paradip, Visakhapatnam, New Mangaluru, Mormugao and Kandla. Other than these, there are 187 minor and intermediate ports, 43 of which handle cargo.

Maritime transportation in India is managed by the Shipping Corporation of India, a government-owned company that also manages offshore and other marine transport infrastructure in the country. It owns and operates about 35% of Indian tonnage and operates in practically all areas of shipping business servicing both national and international trades. The only Indian state with three ports is Tamil Nadu, they are Ennore, Chennai and Tuticorin.

It has a fleet of 79 ships of 2,750,000 GT (4.8 million DWT) and also manages 53 research, survey and support vessels of 120,000 GT (060,000 DWT) on behalf of various government departments and other organisations. Personnel are trained at the Maritime Training Institute in Mumbai, a branch of the World Maritime University, which was set up in 1987. The corporation also operates in Malta and Iran through joint ventures.

The distinction between major and minor ports is not based on the amount of cargo handled. The major ports are managed by port trusts which are regulated by the central government. They come under the purview of the Major Port Trusts Act, 1963. The minor ports are regulated by the respective state governments and many of these ports are private ports or captive ports. The total amount of traffic handled at the major ports in 2005–2006 was 382.33 Mt.

Inland Waterways 

India has an extensive network of inland waterways in the form of rivers, canals, backwaters and creeks. Freight transport by waterways is highly underutilised in India compared to other large countries. The total cargo moved by inland waterways is just 0.15% of the total inland traffic in India, compared to the corresponding figures of 20% for Germany and 32% for Bangladesh.

Cargo that is transported in an organised manner is confined to a few waterways in Goa, West Bengal, Assam and Kerala. The Inland Waterways Authority of India (IWAI) is the statutory authority in charge of the waterways in India. It does the function of building the necessary infrastructure in these waterways, surveying the economic feasibility of new projects and also administration and regulation. The following waterways have been declared as National Waterways:

Pipelines 
Oil and gas industry in India imports 82% of its oil needs and aims to bring that down to 67% by 2022 by replacing it with local exploration, renewable energy and indigenous ethanol fuel (c. Jan 2018).

Logistics

Logistics in India ranking moved up to 35th place in 2016 from 54th in 2014 on World Bank's Global Logistics Performance Index. Government strategy aims to raise the share of global trade in  India's GDP (US$2.7 trillion in FY 2017–18) to 40%, including half of it (20% of GDP) from exports (c. Jan 2019). Cost of logistics in India is 14% of GDP, which is higher than the developed nations, and government reforms aim to bring it down to 10% of GDP by 2022 (c. Jan 2018). Ministry of Commerce and Industry has created a new dedicated centralised Logistics division in collaboration with Singapore and Japan to handle the logistics which was earlier handled by several different ministries, such as railways, roads, shipping and aviation. To boot exports, each state will have exports and logistic policy and Nodal officers will be appointed at district level (c. Jan 2018). There are 64 transactions and 37 government agencies in the end-to-end production-to-export process. To further improve the ranking, improve speed of logistics, ease of doing business and reduce the cost of logistics, India is creating a "common online integrated logistics e-marketplace portal" that will cover all transactions in production and export, connect buyers with logistics service providers and government agencies such as the customs department Icegate system, Port Community Systems, Sea and Air Port terminals, Shipping lines, Railways, etc. (c. Jan 2018).

As part of the US$125 billion port-led development project Sagarmala, the government will define the regulatory framework for the Indian logistics operational standards by India's 300 dry ports logistics parks (inland container depots or ICDs) to the top 10 logistics international best practices nations to boost exports, remove supply chain bottlenecks, reduce transaction costs, optimise logistics mix, set up new hub-and-spoke dry ports (c. January 2018). To reduce the logistics costs by 10% and  emissions by 12%, the government is also developing 35 new "Multimodal Logistics Parks" (MMLPs) on 36 ring roads, which will facilitate 50% of the freight moved in India. Land has been earmarked and pre-feasibility studies are underway for six of these MMLPs (c. May 2017).

Confederation of Indian Industry (CII) and government will organise an annual national logistics convention. Major supply chain solution providers include Container Corporation of India and Transport Corporation of India, and Logistics Management magazine is one of the industry publications.

Modernisation 

In 1998, the Supreme Court of India published a directive that specified the date of April 2001 as deadline to replace or convert all buses, three-wheelers and taxis in Delhi to compressed natural gas.

The Karnataka State Road Transport Corporation was the first state transport undertaking in India to utilise bio-fuels and ethanol-blended fuels. KSRTC took an initiative to do research in alternative fuel forms by experimenting with various alternatives — blending diesel with biofuels such as honge, palm, sunflower, groundnut, coconut and sesame. In 2009, the corporation decided to promote the use of biofuel buses.

In 2017, the government announced that by 2030, only electric vehicles would be sold in the country. It also announced that by 2022 all trains would be electric.

In March 2020, the Government of India temporarily suspended all passenger rail, metro and bus services due to COVID-19

See also 

 Multimodel and international

North-South Transport Corridor
 Ashgabat agreement, a multimodal transport agreement signed by India, Oman, Iran, Turkmenistan, Uzbekistan and Kazakhstan, for creating an international transport and transit corridor facilitating transportation of goods between Central Asia and the Persian Gulf.
 Similar rail development
 Dedicated freight corridors in India
 Future of rail transport in India, rail development

 Similar roads development
 Bharatmala
 Diamond Quadrilateral, subsumed in Bharatmala
 Golden Quadrilateral, completed national road development connectivity older scheme
 India-China Border Roads, subsumed in Bharatmala
 Expressways of India
 Setu Bharatam, river road bridge development in India

 Similar ports and river transport development
 List of National Waterways in India
 Sagar Mala project, national water port development connectivity scheme

 Similar air transport development
 Guided missiles of India
 List of ISRO missions
 Indian Human Spaceflight Programme
 UDAN, national airport development connectivity scheme
 List of ISRO missions

 General
 Traffic collisions in India
 Urban rail transit in India
 Aerial lift in India

References

External links 

 Follow a young commuter on her way through Mumbai, a web documentary by Deutsche Welle Global Ideas (www.dw.de/globalideas)
 Ministry of Road Transport & Highways
 Mile by Mile, India Paves a Smoother Road to Its Future, The New York Times, 4 December 2005.
 Motor Vehicles Act, 1988